The 1975 Tour de France was the 62nd edition of the Tour de France, one of cycling's Grand Tours. The Tour began in Charleroi, Belgium with a prologue individual time trial on 26 June, and Stage 11 occurred on 8 July with a mountainous stage from  Pau. The race finished in Paris on 20 July.

Stage 11
8 July 1975 – Pau to Saint-Lary-Soulan Pla d'Adet,

Stage 12
9 July 1975 – Tarbes to Albi,

Stage 13
10 July 1975 – Albi to Super-Lioran,

Stage 14
11 July 1975 – Aurillac to Puy de Dôme,

Rest day 2
12 July 1975 – Nice

Stage 15
13 July 1975 – Nice to Pra-Loup,

Stage 16
14 July 1975 – Barcelonnette to Serre Chevalier,

Stage 17
15 July 1975 – Valloire to Morzine Avoriaz,

Stage 18
16 July 1975 – Morzine to Châtel,  (ITT)

Stage 19
17 July 1975 – Thonon-les-Bains to Chalon-sur-Saône,

Stage 20
18 July 1975 – Pouilly-en-Auxois to Melun,

Stage 21
19 July 1975 – Melun to Senlis,

Stage 22
20 July 1975 – Paris to Paris Champs-Élysées,

References

1975 Tour de France
Tour de France stages